Swedish women's football champions is a title held by the winners of the highest Swedish football league played each year, Damallsvenskan.

Below is a list of the players awarded medals.

Players

A

Maja Åström – Djurgården/Älvsjö 2004

B

Kristin Bengtsson – Djurgården/Älvsjö 2004
Ulrika Björn – Djurgården/Älvsjö 2003
Ingrid Bohlin – Djurgården/Älvsjö 2004
Therese Brogårde – Djurgården/Älvsjö 2003, 2004
Jill Buchwald – Djurgården/Älvsjö 2003, 2004

C

Marijke Callebaut – Djurgården/Älvsjö 2004
Josefine Christensen – Djurgården/Älvsjö 2003
Jenny Curtsdotter – Djurgården/Älvsjö 2003, 2004

F

Helen Fagerström – Djurgården/Älvsjö 2003, 2004
Linda Fagerström – Djurgården/Älvsjö 2003, 2004
Elin Flyborg – Djurgården/Älvsjö 2003

G

Nadja Gyllander – Djurgården/Älvsjö 2003, 2004
Anna Hall – Djurgården/Älvsjö 2004
Venus James – Djurgården/Älvsjö 2004
Sara Johansson – Djurgården/Älvsjö 2003, 2004
Jennie Jonsson – Djurgården/Älvsjö 2003, 2004

K

Tina Kindvall – Djurgården/Älvsjö 2003

L

Jessica Landström – Djurgården/Älvsjö 2003, 2004

N

Linda Nöjd – Djurgården/Älvsjö 2003
Ann-Marie Norlin – Djurgården/Älvsjö 2003, 2004
Malin Nykvist – Djurgården/Älvsjö 2003, 2004

S

Annica Svensson – Djurgården/Älvsjö 2003, 2004
Victoria Svensson – Djurgården/Älvsjö 2003, 2004

T

Sara Thunebro – Djurgården/Älvsjö 2003, 2004
Jane Törnqvist – Djurgården/Älvsjö 2003, 2004

W

Katarina Wicksell – Djurgården/Älvsjö 2003, 2004

References

See also
List of Swedish women's football champions
List of Swedish football champions (players)
List of Swedish junior champions

Women's champions